Bai Island is an island located near Sandakan in the Sandakan Division, Sabah, Malaysia. It is also known as a perfect place for fishing.

See also
 List of islands of Malaysia

External links 
 Major Island in Sandakan

References 

Islands of Sabah